= Pazo de San Lorenzo de Trasouto =

Coordinates: 42.8781°N 8.5577°W

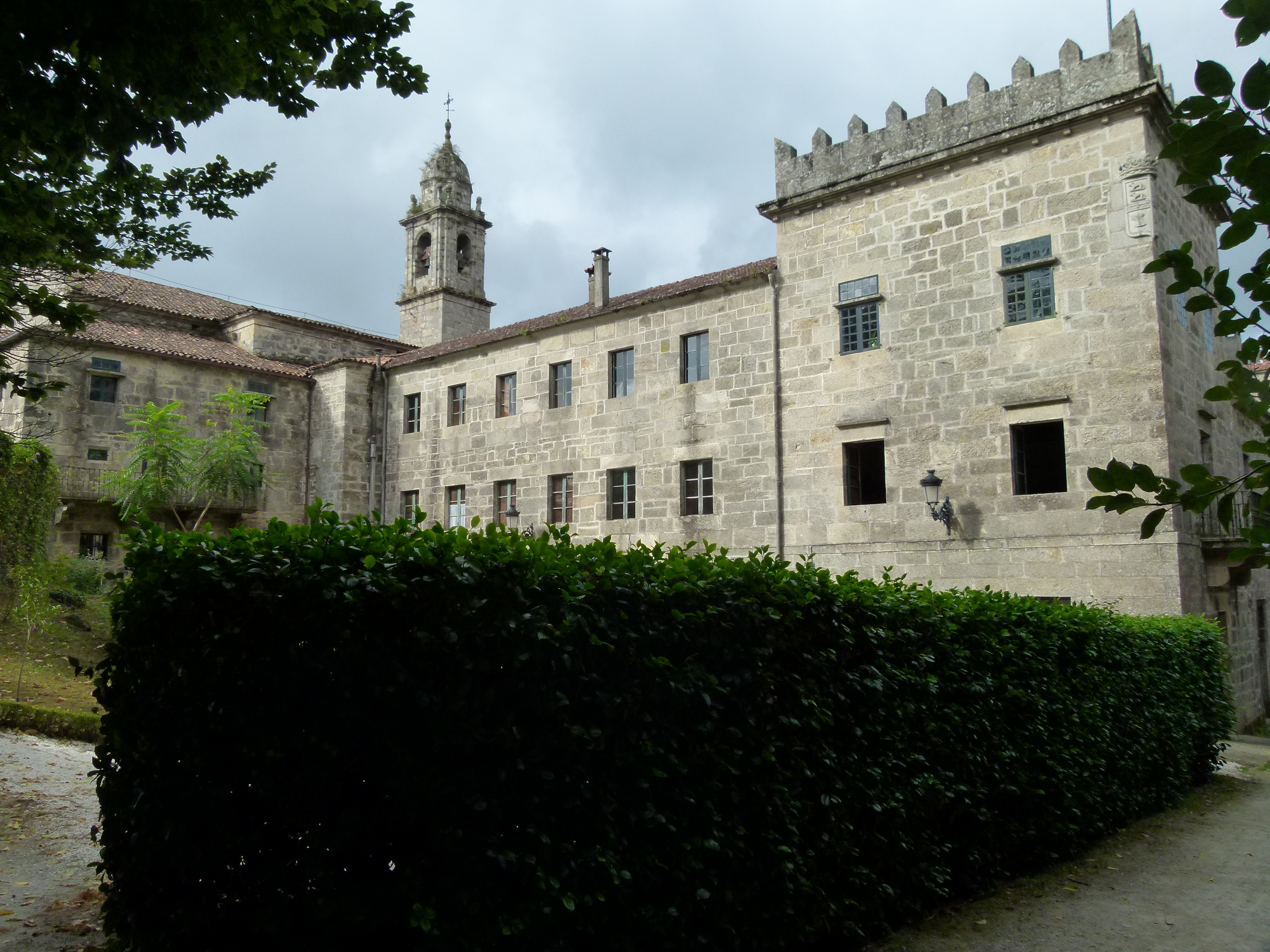
Pazo de San Lorenzo de Trasouto

Pazo de San Lorenzo de Trasouto is a palace built in the 13th century as a Franciscan monastery in Santiago de Compostela, La Coruña, A Coruña, Spain.

It was founded in the 13th Century by Martín Arias, bishop of Zamora as a chapel to Saint Lawrence. It is notable for its topiaried cloister garden.

The cloister garden at Pazo de San Lorenzo
